Arnaud Cohen is a French contemporary artist, sculptor, and visual artist, born January 28, 1968, in Paris, France.

Biography
Presented in 2015 by the daily Le Figaro as one of the ten personalities reinventing culture in France, Arnaud Cohen began his career as a visual artist in 1997 by integrating the Marwan Hoss gallery (Paris and Brussels, Marwan Hoss was then also Vice President of the International Fair of Contemporary Art). After a setback following the partial closure of the Marwan Hoss Gallery in 2000, Cohen is back at work in 2005. While dealing with the same obsessions (the individual responsibility in the context of the building of shared destinies), his art evolves radically on the formal level: Cohen remained an appropriationist, but his practice moved from collaging objects to collaging ideas, slipping these ideas into established forms and styles to better pervert them. His practice is close to twentieth-century propaganda practices used both in the 1920s and 1930s in Russia and Germany, and also in the late 1960s, and in the 1970s, to serve the proletarian cause (hence his exhibiting on the occasion of May 68 commemorations side by side with Gérard Fromanger, Jean-Jacques Lebel and Erró at the Salvador gallery, an exhibition curated by collector Yves Cothouit),  but also since the 1950s to serve the commodification of goods and services. But with Cohen, these tools are built at the sole service of the artist, for the only purpose of sharing with the viewer his very personal vision of today's world. Controversy is part of his vocabulary, and art is there to express it. Using mythical emblems, he manages to unveil with poetry and insight the economic and social meanders. Cohen can be defined as a post-koonsian artist: like Jeff Koons, he uses the popular alphabet, but, and this is the difference from his elder pair, he uses these letters to write words, words which are his but words that can be universally shared.

Some examples through major pieces

Dance over me
The Dance over me World Tour series in their different versions (installation and CCTV recording, but also their transportable versions), are experimental and empirical attempts to
 produce a trace, even fictional, of a past that had vanished;
 address one of the main drivers of the past victories of dictatorships over democracies: the collaboration of the economic, political and cultural elites;
 propose a third way between creating works of art that tend to be commemorative monuments and the pure and simple denial of the past.

After Dansez sur moi 2017 that addressed Western Europe elites' rally around the Nazi régime (exhibited in Berlin and Paris), Tangover Me Buenos Aires and Tangover Me Rosario address the Argentinian dictatorship between 1976 and 1983.
The work borrows from Carl Andre's minimal floor pieces. But unlike the latter who said he was not interested in ideas and that his works had no conceptual nor intellectual qualities, Arnaud Cohen injects a poisonous dimension to Andre's: the work, in its different versions (first studio installation, then CCTV and transportable versions), consists of an iron dance floor made of fake graves of real Nazi collaborators, those of Maurice Rocher, a French owner of weapons factories, Jean Bichelonne, a French engineer in charge with Albert Speer to integrate the French factories to the military-industrial complex of the Reich, and Wernher von Braun, who ran the underground V1 and V2 rocket factory at the Dora camp in Germany. Dansez sur moi, exhibited in 2017 at the Rosa Luxemburg Platz Kunstverein in Berlin, was then presented in 2018 in Paris at the Memorial de la Shoah (Holocaust Memorial), in 2019 at Le Confort Moderne in Poitiers France and simultaneously at the UNTREF Museum Buenos Aires Argentina as part of the official BIENALSUR 2019 selection. Another version of the work will be exhibited in Uganda in 2020 as part of the official Kampala Art Biennale's Masters Selection. It will address the Idi Amin Dada Oumee dictatorship.

Art Speaks For Itself (ASFI)
In 2014, Cohen creates ArtSpeaksForItself, a conceptual work that formally imitates a foundation. Although without legal existence, ASFI runs a network of residences of international curators. Cohen inaugurated in September 2014 his first residence in Paris, and the following year a second one in Milan. If he considers this work of art to be particularly utopian, aiming to reverse the roles and balance of power within the art world, he surrounded himself from the very beginning of this enterprise with real, existing, French personalities, Ministers advisors, Curators, Critics, Art Historians, Foundation and Institutional Managers, and Collectors like Sandra Hegedüs Mulliez, Jean-Pierre Biron, Maxence Alcalde, Marie-Ann Yemsi, Marie Deparis, Laurent de Verneuil, Damien Brachet or Adama Sanneh. The first guest was Wang Chunchen, curator in charge of the Chinese pavilion at the last Venice Biennale in 2013. The curatorial protocol of ASFI was applied in 2018 to the feminist exhibition of the Tate dedicated to the writings of Virginia Woolf curated by Laura Smith (now curator at the Whitechapel Gallery in London), and in 2015 at one of the shows exhibited by the MUNTREF, Museum of Contemporary Art in Buenos Aires. Arnaud Cohen was invited to perform this work in 2015 at Something Else off Cairo Biennale in 2015 and at the Dakar Biennale in 2016 by the international curator Simon Njami. It is also for this work that Cohen was invited to the 2017 Venice Biennale by Koyo Kouho (Swiss pavilion, Pro Helvetia) and the same year at Biennale of South America BIENALSUR by Anibal Jozami and Diana Wechsler. Among the most prestigious participants at these symposia were Anne Barlow, Artistic Director of Tate St Ives, Florence Derieux Artistic Director of the Centre Pompidou Foundation, and Galerie Hauser and Wirth of New York, Georges Didi-Hubermann, Albertine de Galbert, Rebecca Lamarche Vadel curator at the Palais de Tokyo, Enrico Lunghi Chief Curator of MUDAM, or Jean-Hubert Martin.

ASFI benefited in 2016 from a public presentation at the Centre Pompidou, on the initiative of Alicia Knock as part of Museum On / Of, in 2017 at the Untref Museum of Buenos Aires and at the Château de Montsoreau-Museum of Contemporary Art as part of the event Protest.

The work of Arnaud Cohen was the subject of a monographic exhibition and a retrospective at the Museums of Sens from June to September 2015. Threatened to be censored, the whole exhibition was maintained thanks to the support of the International Association of Art Critics and personalities such as Elisabeth Lebovici, but many of his exhibited works got vandalized inside the museum premises.

Big Red Kiss
In 2007, Cohen had enlarged a bottle of Coke (10 feet tall) and reduced airliners. The crash of these two well-known elements (the bottle struck by the planes) delivers a new specific meaning. In addition, its plasticity, the iconic presence of this new object, creates a new term both obvious and complex: it shows both the current struggles embodied by the events of September 11, and the collapse of values related to consumerism, not to mention the still-nascent problem of wars to come around the global issue of drinking water (it takes indeed up to 9 liters of water to produce one liter of Coke). Cohen didn't hide that this work also gave him the opportunity to symbolically kill the neo-pop art father figure Jeff Koons.

JPR Campaigns
Since 2005, the date of the creation of a fictional character named Jean-Paul Raynaud (and not Jean-Pierre Raynaud), an archetype of the French official artist, he posted in various public places, fake political posters with ambiguous slogans mocking the incestuous links between French artists and the government's cultural agencies. One of them was "SAVE THE MARKET, NATIONALIZE ART DEALERS". All of these campaign materials (posters, badges, etc.) were acquired in 2008 by the Museum of Contemporary History, Paris, France.

Public exhibitions and acquisitions
Arnaud Cohen has participated in more than thirty exhibitions in the last five years and has entered several public collections, either through purchases (Museum of Contemporary History, Hôtel des Invalides, Paris) or through public commissions (Artotheques of Châtellerault, Angoulême and Poitiers).

The exhibitions and biennials in which he participated in 2019 and before include:

 Internationally:
 BIENALSUR, Buenos Aires, 2019.
 Confort Moderne, Poitiers, France, 2019
 Paris Mémorial de la Shoah Museum, 2019
 Tate St Ives, 2018. 
 Something Else Biennale Cairo, Cairo, 2018.
 Nagel Draxler Gallery, Cologne, Germany, 2018.
 Kunstverein am Rosa Luxemburg Platz, Berlin, 2017. 
 Venice Biennale, Swiss Exhibition (Pro Helvetia), 2017. 
 BIENALSUR, Buenos Aires, 2017. 
 Dakar Biennale, Raw Material, Dakar, 2016. 
 Something Else Biennale Cairo, Cairo, 2015. 
 Cutlog NY Art Fair Frieze off, New York, 2014. 
 Fort of Chillon, Montreux, Switzerland, 2013. 
 Sunday Issue Gallery Tokyo, 2013. 
 School Gallery Brussels, 2012. 
 16th Poznan Triennial Sculpture, Poland. 
 Emergency Room @ Naples Art Museum, Napoli. 
 Diva Art Fair off Miami art Basel, Miami. 
 Contemporary Art Center, New York.
 France:
 Memorial de la Shoah, Paris, 2018.
 Les Bains, Paris, 2017.
 Galerie Valérie Delaunay, 2017.
 Artothèque du Havre, Le Havre, 2017.
 Palais de Tokyo, 2016.
 Kepler Art Conseil, 2016.
 Monastère royal de Brou, Bourg-en-Bresse, 2015.
 Musée de Sens et Palais synodal de Sens, 2015.
 Fondation Vasarely, 2015.
 YIA Art Fair, 2015.
 FYOW Mairie de Montreuil, Montreuil, 2013.
 Gaité Lyrique, Paris, 2013.
 APACC, Montreuil, 2013.
 Galerie 22,48m², Paris, 2012.
 Galerie Talmart, 2012.
 Galerie A Rebours, 2012.
 In & Out, pop-up museum, Ivry, 2012.
 Galerie Laure Roynette, Paris, 2012.
 Galerie Salvador
 School Galerie
 Galerie Taïss
 Galerie W
 Galerie Xavier Nicolas
 et avec certaines de ces galeries : YIA Art Fair (en 2015 comme artiste invité), Cutlog Art Fair, ShowOff Art Fair, Slick Art Fair.
 FRAC Poitou-Charentes (fonds des Artothèques d'Angoulême et de La Rochelle)
 Centre d'art contemporain de Châtellerault, Châtellerault.

Interviews, bibliography and critical texts
Links to interviews and critical or monographic texts in French (2018-2010):

 Claude Guibert in Imago-encyclopédie audiovisuelle de l'art contemporain February 2018 
 Susana Reinoso in Clarin (Argentina), September 20, 2017
 Arianna di Cori in La Repubblica (Italia) July 7, 2016
 Claude Guibert in Imago-encyclopédie audiovisuelle de l'art contemporain 2016
 France Culture, Cohen interviewed by Céline du Chéné, Mauvais Genre, September 2015 (starts at 1: 13.13)
 Claude Guibert in imago-encyclopédie audiovisuelle de l'art contemporain juillet 2015
 France Culture, Cohen interviewed by Aude Lavigne, Les Carnets de la Création, July 2015
 Paul Ardenne in Arnaud Cohen Remission / Retrospection, catalog of the double monographic exhibition at the Synodal Palace and the Museum of Sens 
 Damepipi.tv, Cohen interviewed by Yvette Neliaz, June 2015
 Elisabeth Lebovici in Le Beau Vice June 2015
 Patrick Scemama in La République de l'Art June 2015
 Maxence Alcalde in Osskoor June 2015
 Claude Guibert in imago-encyclopédie audiovisuelle de l'art contemporain July 2013
 Julie Crenn in revue LAURA N°14 October 2012
 Maxence Alcalde in Osskoor September 2012
 Claude Guibert in imago-encyclopédie audiovisuelle de l'art contemporain September 2012
 Christophe Donner in le Monde, 4 February 2012
 Marc Lenot in lunettesrouges.blog.lemonde.fr 2012
 Thierry Hay in Culturebox France Télévisions 2012Marie Deparis-Yafil in Vu et revue Part VI 2012
 Maxence Alcalde in Osskoor January 2012
 Julie Crenn in Inferno 2012
 Valery Poulet in performArts 2012
 Valery Poulet in Transversales 2012
 Claude Guibert in imago-encyclopédie audiovisuelle de l'art contemporain January 2012
 Marie Elisabeth de la Fresnaye in Beautiful and delights 2012
 Ariane Cloutier in Conference "Spaces for the artist's life: internments at work" held at the University of Franche-Comté, Besançon, September 23 and 24, 2011 
 Valery Poulet in Transversales 2010
Monographs and critical texts before 2010:
 IDEAT, February 2009 n°66 : "le meilleur de la création française contemporaine": 
 Figaro Madame, 17 January 2009 : "l'expo incontournable" 
 1968 a moving world: December 2008 (Museum of Contemporary History - BDIC - Syllepse Editions, 21, 242–244, 292), biographical text of 3 pages and 5 reproductions.
 Art, creative exchanges: October 2008 (Fabrice Peletier, Pyramyd Editions,  et 101)
 ArtScape : 22 October 2008 : la petite foire qui monte.
 Le Monde, Harry Bellet : 21 June 2008 : 68-Tard
 Metro : 7 May 2008 : Que faire ce week-end en Île-de-France
 Radio France International, Françoise Dentinger : 11 April 2008 : L'art en eaux troubles
 Soir3, Marie Drucker : 8 April 2008 : L'art en eaux troubles
 PS 86 (revue web de la fédération socialiste de la Vienne), Claude Husson : October 2007 : A Ségolène Royal's installation
 French Morning (NYC), Marie Camille Descamps : September 2007 : Premières françaises à Hell's kitchen
 French Culture.org, French Embassy in the USA: September 2007: Full View: French Artist in New York

References

External links
 Arnaud Cohen's official website (in English and French)
 ASFI Foundation's official website (in English)

Living people
1968 births
Sculptors from Paris